Baiba Bendika (born 27 June 1991) is a Latvian biathlete.

She made her Biathlon World Cup debut in 2011. During the 2015–16 World Cup season, she reached her career first Top 10, finishing fifth at the 7.5 km spring in Canmore. It was the first time she gained World Cup points. Already next week in Presque Isle, she finished 15th at the 7.5 km sprint and 13th at the 10 km pursuit.

She competed at the 2022 Winter Olympics, in Biathlon Women's sprint, and Women's 4 × 5 kilometre relay.

Baiba Bendika and Andrejs Rastorgujevs used nine spare rounds and the usual whirlwind dynamics accompanying the fiercest competition in the BMW IBU World Cup placed in Nové Město na Moravě, clinching third place in the Single Mixed Relays and a first-ever Relay podium for Latvia.

Biathlon results
All results are sourced from the International Biathlon Union.

Olympic Games
0 medals

World Championships 
0 medals

*During Olympic seasons competitions are only held for those events not included in the Olympic program.
**The single mixed relay was added as an event in 2019.

World Cup 

*Key:Points—won World Cup points; Position—World Cup season ranking.

World Cup Record

Finish in the Top 15

References

External links

1991 births
Living people
Latvian female biathletes
Olympic biathletes of Latvia
People from Cēsis
Biathletes at the 2018 Winter Olympics
Biathletes at the 2022 Winter Olympics
Latvian female cross-country skiers
Cross-country skiers at the 2022 Winter Olympics
Olympic cross-country skiers of Latvia
21st-century Latvian women